Mary Vaughan (born 7 March 1953) is an Irish archer.

Archery

Vaughan competed at the World Archery Championships in 1983, 1985 and 1989 finishing 68th, 46th and 88th respectively.

At the 1984 Summer Olympic Games she came 39th with 2298 points scored in the women's individual event.

References

External links 
 Profile on worldarchery.org

1953 births
Living people
Irish female archers
Olympic archers of the Republic of Ireland
Archers at the 1984 Summer Olympics